Agapanthia soror is a species of beetle in the subfamily Lamiinae, found in Kazakhstan and Uzbekistan. Their flight time is from April to June.

References

soror
Beetles described in 1882